Amblygaster leiogaster, the smoothbelly sardinella, also known as blue sardine, blue sprat, bluebait, is a reef-associated marine species of sardinella in the herring family Clupeidae. It is one of the three species of genus Amblygaster. It is found in the marine waters along Indo-West Pacific regions towards south western Australia. The fish has 13 to 21 dorsal soft rays and 12 to 23 anal soft rays. It grows up to a maximum length of 23 cm. The flank is gold in fresh fish but becomes black while preservation. Belly is more rounded and scutes are not prominent. It is rather closely resemble Amblygaster clupeoides, but the latter has very few lower gill rakers than Smoothbelly sardinella. The fish feeds on minute organisms like zooplankton.

See also
 Amblygaster clupeoides 
 Amblygaster sirm 
 Commercial fish of Sri Lanka

References

Clupeidae
Fish described in 1847
Taxa named by Achille Valenciennes